Jorge Cervós-Navarro  (vel Jordi Cervós i Navarro; 9 January 1930 – 14 November 2021) was a Spanish pathologist, histologist, and neuroscientist.

Life 
Studied medicine at the Universities of Barcelona and Zaragossa. PhD  University Complutense of Madrid (1956). 
Since 1968 Chair of Institute of Neuropathology, Free University of Berlin. Has been Dean of the Faculty of Medicine at the above-mentioned University. Member of the Council of the International Society of Neuropathology and Executive President of the German Society of Neuropathology and Neuroanatomy. Has also been Rector of the International University of Catalonia from the year of its foundation in 1997 until 2001.
He has published various handbooks  about his specialty, translated into various languages.
Doctor honoris causa from the University of Zaragoza (1984), University of Barcelona, University Complutense of Madrid, Leibniz University Hannover (Germany), University of Tokushima (Japan), University Saransk (Russia) and Aristotle University of Thessaloniki (Greece).

Works 
 Pathology of Cerebral Microcirculation  Ed. de Gruyter, Berlin-New York, 1974 
 Estudio al microscopio electrónico del ganglio raquídeo normal y después de la ciaticotomía Ed. CSIC, Madrid, 1979. 
 Metabolic and Degenerative Diseases of the Central Nervous System: Pathology, Biochemistry, and Genetics Ed. Academic Press, 1995, San Diego, 
 Cerebral Microcirculation and Metabolism 
 Neuropathology and Neuropharmacology

See also
 Pathology
 List of pathologists

References

1930 births
2021 deaths
Complutense University of Madrid alumni
20th-century Spanish physicians
21st-century Spanish physicians
Spanish neuroscientists
History of neuroscience
Spanish pathologists
Spanish anatomists
Spanish scientists
Histologists
Officers Crosses of the Order of Merit of the Federal Republic of Germany
20th-century Spanish scientists
21st-century Spanish scientists
Scientists from Barcelona